The siege of Ariminum also referred to as the siege of Rimini was fought between Byzantine forces under Belisarius and John and an Ostrogothic force. The Goths lifted the siege after Belisarius approached with multiple forces from multiple angles. He also had his men light extra camp fires, this way it seemed to the besieging Goths like a large force was approaching them.

Prelude 
When the Siege of Rome was in its final stages, Belisarius sent John, nephew of Vitalianus into Picenum to occupy the region. John noticed, after the citizens of Ariminum invited him to take the town, that the position of Ariminum in between Rome and the Gothic capital of Ravenna would probably cause Witigis to lift the siege of Rome and retreat if it was occupied. John defeated the Gothic commander Ulitheus in battle and took Ariminum. As expected the Goths retreated from Rome. Belisarius predicted that the Goths would soon try to besiege John at Ariminum. He sent Ildiger and Martinus to replace John. This had two reasons: the Goths would be less likely to see them as a threat than the renowned John with his cavalry and as such might avert their attention to somewhere else and John’s cavalry would not be as effective in a siege as it was at harassing the Goths in the open. John refused to leave instead staying with the infantry reinforcement in Ariminum.

Siege 
Shortly after Ildiger and Martinus left for Belisarius, leaving their troops with John, Witigis besieged the town.  Witigis quickly built a siege tower which unlike during the siege of Rome wasn’t pulled by oxen but moved by men stationed inside. The tower was placed close to the wall guarded from Byzantine attack by a contingent of troops. The Byzantines moved out of the town to dig a trench in front of the siege tower. When the Goths found out they attacked the Byzantines who retreated as soon as the trench was deep enough. Witigis had the trench filled with faggots before moving over it. The weight of the tower caused it to sink a little bit into the trench as the faggots were crushed and the earthwork made of the dirt out of the trench which was built behind it stopped the advance entirely.

Witigis decided to withdraw taking the tower with him. John wanted to prevent this and sallied out but was unsuccessful at destroying the siege tower. The Goths had suffered so many casualties that Witigis decided against storming the city and began starving it out. Needing less men for this he also sent men to attack Ancon.

John sent a letter to Belisarius informing him John was about to run out of supplies. Belisarius decide to lift the siege by deception. He split his army into four groups three of which were sent to the vicinity of Ariminum. One force was to move by sea, while another was ordered to light many extra campfires to exaggerate its size. This way the Byzantines would appear to have a huge force. In reality the Goths outnumbered the Byzantines so Belisarius wanted to avoid actual fighting. On his march Belisarius’ encountered a force of Goths who were heavily defeated and fled back to the Gothic camp. They claimed the Byzantines approached with a large force from the north. At night however they observed Martinus’ force’s many campfires. Now the Goths were frightened, a feeling which got stronger when the Byzantine fleet appeared in the morning. Soon after the siege was lifted by the Goths.

After the siege John said that his gratitude laid solely with Narses as he supposedly forced Belisarius to make the attempt. The Byzantine leadership would grow more divided and ineffective as a result.

Sources

Ariminum
Ariminum
Ariminum
538
Gothic War (535–554)
Ariminum
Rimini
530s in the Byzantine Empire